The Shelters are a rock band formed in 2015 in Los Angeles, California by Chase Simpson, Josh Jové, and Sebastian Harris. All members had previously played in the band Automatik Slim. Tom Petty took an interest in the band and gave them the keys to his home studio, offering a listening ear and advice on whatever they were working on. They spent countless hours in his studio, working both on their own and with Petty. Both Jové and Simpson have credit on Tom Petty and the Heartbreakers’s 2014 album Hypnotic Eye and on Mudcrutch's 2016 album 2 (Mudcrutch album).

Current members 
 Chase Simpson – vocals, guitars
 Josh Jové – guitars, vocals
 Sebastian Harris – drums

Past members 
 Jacob Pillot – Bass

Discography
Albums
The Shelters (2016)
Jupiter Sidecar (2019)

EPs
EP (2015)

Singles
"Rebel Heart" (2016) #40 Alternative Songs
"Really Wanted You" / "So Get Out" 7" (2017) (Record Store Day Exclusive)
"You're Different" (2019)

Debut album

The Shelters is the eponymous debut album by American heartland rock band The Shelters. Co-produced by Tom Petty, it was released by Warner Bros. Records on June 10, 2016.

Track listing

Personnel 
The Shelters

 Chase Simpson – vocals, guitars, keys
 Josh Jové – vocals, guitars, pedal steel guitar, keys, bass
 Sebastian Harris – drums, percussion

Jupiter Sidecar 
Jupiter Sidecar is the sophomore album by American rock band The Shelters. Tom Petty (who died in 2017) acted as a sounding board for many of the tracks when they were in their demo stages, including "Strange," "Waiting for Life to Begin," and "Can't Go Home." It was released by Warner Bros. Records on September 20, 2019.

Track listing

References

External links
 
 

Musical groups from Los Angeles
Warner Records artists
Musical groups established in 2015
2015 establishments in California